This is a list of publishing companies of Albania.

Publishing Companies

References 

 
Publishing companies